Tanganikallabes is a genus of airbreathing catfishes that are endemic to Lake Tanganyika in East Africa.

Species
There are currently three recognized species in this genus:

 Tanganikallabes alboperca J. J. Wright & R. M. Bailey, 2012
 Tanganikallabes mortiauxi Poll, 1943
 Tanganikallabes stewarti J. J. Wright & R. M. Bailey, 2012

References

 
Clariidae
Catfish genera

Freshwater fish genera
Taxa named by Max Poll
Taxonomy articles created by Polbot